The BM-25 Korshun (Kite) as its Russian (GRAU designation 2K5) name was a multiple rocket launcher designed in the Soviet Union. It was capable of launching 3R7 250 mm rockets from six launch tubes. The support vehicle is a YAZ-214.

Development
The system was developed in scientific research institute NII-88 in 1953. Its rockets were propelled by a mix of kerosene and nitric acid. It has a range of 55km but was inaccurate.

Use 
Due to severe inaccuracy of the rocket, only a small quantity had been produced in USSR from 1957 to 1960. It was exported to South Yemen, which used them against North Yemen.

See also
Katyusha rocket launcher

Notes

 

Cold War artillery of the Soviet Union
Multiple rocket launchers of the Soviet Union
Military vehicles introduced in the 1950s